Vilouna "Tot Lina" Phetmany is a Laotian actress.

Biography
Phetmany was born to Laotian family and raised in Vientiane, Laos. She began modeling after high school although modeling at the time meant representing Laotian culture and strong values rather than selling clothes. As Laos began to open up to the outside world, she found it difficult to secure bookings as Laotian people preferred light skinned models. She persisted and eventually succeeded in modeling and then as a pop star, TV personality, and actress in commercials. In 2016, she was cast in the lead role in Nong Hak (Lao: ນ້ອງຮັກ) which was released as Dearest Sister in English, directed by Mattie Do. Dearest Sister was selected as the Laotian entry for the Best Foreign Language Film at the 90th Academy Awards, the first time that Laos has submitted a film for consideration in this category.

Phetmany is also known by her stage name "Tot Lina."

References

External links

Living people
Laotian actresses
People from Vientiane
Year of birth missing (living people)